Portraits in Ivory and Brass is an album by trumpeter Jack Walrath with pianist Larry Willis and bassist Steve Novosel which was recorded in 1992 and released on the Mapleshade label in 1994.

Track listing
All compositions by Jack Walrath except where noted
 "Bess, You Is My Woman Now" (George Gershwin, Ira Gershwin) – 4:59
 "Epitaph for Seikolos" – 4:55
 "Shadows" (Larry Willis) – 10:14
 "Kirsten" – 9:43
 "Monk's Feet" – 9:50
 "Road to Sophia" – 11:42
 "Blues in F (Improvised)" – 9:30
 "Green Eyes" (Willis) – 7:47

Personnel
Jack Walrath – trumpet 
Larry Willis – piano
Steve Novosel – bass

References

Mapleshade Records albums
Jack Walrath albums
Larry Willis albums
1994 albums